Vanishing Points (1992) is a novel by Australian author Thea Astley. It consists of two loosely linked novellas, The Genteel Poverty Bus Company and Inventing the Weather.

Reviews

 Publishers Weekly
 Kirkus Reviews

Awards and nominations

 1993 shortlisted Miles Franklin Award

References

1992 Australian novels
Novels by Thea Astley
Heinemann (publisher) books